website reference (Wikipedia )

References

Audi Sport Factory